is a Paralympian athlete from Japan competing mainly in category T52 long-distance events.

Olympic career
Takada competed in the 2004 Summer Paralympics in Athens, Greece where he won a gold medal in the men's Marathon - T52 event, a gold medal in the men's 5000 metres - T52 event, a gold medal in the men's 400 metres - T52 event and a bronze medal in the men's 1500 metres - T52 event.  He also competed at the 2008 Summer Paralympics in Beijing, China. There he won a silver medal in the men's 400 metres - T52 event, a silver medal in the men's 800 metres - T52 event and a bronze medal in the men's Marathon - T52 event

External links
 

Paralympic athletes of Japan
Athletes (track and field) at the 2004 Summer Paralympics
Athletes (track and field) at the 2008 Summer Paralympics
Paralympic gold medalists for Japan
Paralympic silver medalists for Japan
Paralympic bronze medalists for Japan
Year of birth missing (living people)
Living people
Medalists at the 2004 Summer Paralympics
Medalists at the 2008 Summer Paralympics
Paralympic medalists in athletics (track and field)
21st-century Japanese people